David Grimes  is a career meteorologist who studied mathematics and nuclear and quantum physics at Brock University in Ontario, Canada. He has been assistant deputy minister of Environment and Climate Change Canada in charge of the Meteorological Service of Canada since July 2006. From 2011 to 2019, he was elected president of the World Meteorological Organization by its 189 members, succeeding Alexander Bedritskiy of Russia.

In 2020, he was appointed as a Member of the Order of Canada. The same year, Grimes was given the International Meteorological Organization Prize.

References 

Living people
World Meteorological Organization people
Canadian meteorologists
Brock University alumni
Year of birth missing (living people)
Canadian officials of the United Nations
Members of the Order of Canada
People from Ottawa